Elections to Leeds City Council were held on Thursday, 5 May 1983, with one third of the council to be elected.

The unwinding of much of Alliance's momentum helped Labour defend most of their 1982 losses, with the Conservative and Alliance gains restricted to a seat apiece in Morley North and Burmantofts respectively. The Conservative ousted by the Alliance gain in ultra-marginal Horsforth the year before won his way back onto the council with the only other gain of the night.

Election result

This result has the following consequences for the total number of seats on the council after the elections:

Ward results

References

1983 English local elections
1983
1980s in Leeds